Rybarzowice may refer to:

Rybarzowice, Lower Silesian Voivodeship in Gmina Bogatynia, Zgorzelec County in Lower Silesian Voivodeship (south-west Poland)
Rybarzowice, Silesian Voivodeship (south Poland)